Count Franciszek Maksymilian Ossoliński (2 April 1676 – 1 July 1756) was a Polish nobleman, politician, diplomat and a patron of arts.

Son of Łowczy and Chorąży Maksymilian Ossoliński and Teodora Krassowska. He was married in 1706 to Katarzyna Miączyńska and in 1732, in Lwów, married Katarzyna Jabłonowska, the daughter of Grand Chancellor Stanisław Jan Jabłonowski.

He was Chorąży of Drohiczyn from 1703 to 1710, Court Treasurer in 1713, Grand Treasurer of the Crown from 1729 to 1736, Wielkorządca of Kraków, Żupnik of salt-pits in Bochnia and Wieliczka in 1727.

Governor of Sandomierz, Nur, Ostrów, Drohiczyn, Chmielnik and Niepołomice.

His political and military career began at the end of the 17th century under patronage of Stanisław Antoni Szczuka. He was private secretary to Augustus II and one of his closest co-workers. He was a strong supporter of giving more power to the King. His policy as Grand Treasurer, induced an increase in income from customs duties.

He was a frequent deputy to the Sejm from 1718. As Sejm Marshal of the ordinary Sejm in Warsaw, from 5 May to 16 November 1722, he warned that broken sessions of the Sejm could lead to the downfall and the end of the Polish–Lithuanian Commonwealth.

In 1733 he signed the election of Stanisław I as King of Poland and commanded armed forces in the  defence of the monarch. After the capitulation of Gdańsk in 1734 he was captured by the Russian army.

He refused to submit to King Augustus III and after 1736 he stayed at the court of Stanisław I Leszczyński in Lunéville, Lorraine.

Awards
 Knight of the Order of the White Eagle, awarded in 1709
 Knight of the Order of the Holy Spirit, awarded in 1737
Knight of the Order of Saint Michael, awarded in 1737

Children
 Józef became a Chorąży and voivode
 Anna married Józefat Szaniawski
 Tomasz became a canon, Łowczy, Cześnik and Miecznik

1676 births
1756 deaths
Military personnel of the Polish–Lithuanian Commonwealth
Counts of Poland
Franciszek Maksymilian
Sandomierz confederates (1704)
Recipients of the Order of the White Eagle (Poland)